Hilaria jamesii (formerly Pleuraphis jamesii) is a species of grass known by the common name James' galleta.

Range and habitat
It is native to the southwestern United States, where it is widespread in scrub, woodland, grassland, and plateau habitat. It is tolerant of arid environments such as desert floors. It is common in the northern Mojave Desert.

Growth pattern
It is a rhizomatous perennial grass producing bunches of erect stems about 1 mm wide and up to about 60 cm in maximum height. The woody rhizome is shallow, spreading just under the soil surface, but it may reach 6 ft in length and when dense, helps the grass form a sod. Its stems are not fuzzy like those of its relative, Hilaria rigida.

Flowers
The inflorescence is a series of hairy, rectangular spikelets.

Fruit
The grass produces relatively little viable seed and spreads mostly via its rhizome.

References

External links
Jepson Manual Treatment
USDA Plants Profile
Grass Manual Treatment
Photo gallery

Chloridoideae
Grasses of Mexico
Grasses of the United States
Native grasses of California
Native grasses of the Great Plains region
Native grasses of Nebraska
Native grasses of Oklahoma
Native grasses of Texas
Flora of the Southwestern United States
Flora of the California desert regions
Flora of the Great Basin
Flora of Nevada
Flora of New Mexico
Flora of Wyoming
Natural history of the Mojave Desert
Flora without expected TNC conservation status